This is a list of defunct airlines of Mauritania.

See also

 List of airlines of Mauritania
 List of airports in Mauritania

References

Mauritania
Airlines
Airlines, defunct